Ahmed El Sheikh may refer to:

 Ahmed El Sheikh (footballer, born 1990), Egyptian football attacking midfielder for Al Masr
 Ahmed El Sheikh (footballer, born 1992), Egyptian football winger for Al Masry
 Ahmed Rabee El Sheikh (born 1993), Egyptian football goalkeeper for Tanta